Joshua (Shuky) Borkovsky (Hebrew: יהושע (שוקי) בורקובסקי; b. 19 January 1952 in Rishon LeZion) is an Israeli artist who lives and works in Jerusalem.

Biography 
Joshua (Shuky) Borkovsky was born in 1952. From 1973 to 1977, he studied at the Bezalel Academy of Arts and Design in Jerusalem. He began teaching at the Art Teachers College in Ramat Hasharon in 1978. In 1979, he joined the faculty of Bezalel. He has also taught workshops at the Hebrew University of Jerusalem. In 1980-81, he attended Hunter College in New York for his MFA degree.

Borkovsky's work features phantasmagoric imagery such as the silhouettes of sailing ships, and cartographic and geometric images.

Borkovsky's exhibition at the Israel Museum in 2013, titled "Veronese Green," featured 58 works from 10 cycles of paintings created from 1987 to 2012. Borkovsky creates open-ended cycles with one painting differing slightly from the next. The cyclical nature of these works creates a sense of time standing still. Many of the paintings evoke the image of photographs being developed in a darkroom.

Solo exhibitions
1979 Yarkon Park Art Pavilion, Tel Aviv (Cat.)
1980 Hunter Gallery, New York
1985 Aika Brown Gallery, Jerusalem
1986 Bezalel Academy Art Gallery, Jerusalem
1987 Israel Museum, Jerusalem (Cat.)
1988 Artifact Gallery, Tel Aviv
1990 Gimel Gallery, Jerusalem
1994         "The Death of Virgil", Artifact Gallery, Tel Aviv
1998         "Pin Cone", Noga Gallery, Tel Aviv
2001         "Voyage", Noga Gallery, Tel Aviv
2003         "Echo& Narcissus", paintings, Noga Gallery, Tel Aviv
2003         "Anamorphoses", photographs, Noga Gallery, Tel Aviv
2005         "In Between", Ein-Harod Museum of Art (Cat.)
2006         "Echo & Narcissus", paintings, Noga Gallery, Tel Aviv
2008         "Vera Icon" Noga Gallery, Tel Aviv
2009         "Vera Icon" Oranim college, Oranim

Gallery

Awards and recognition
 2003 Finalist, 'Light and Matter' Competition, The Adi Prize for Jewish Expression in Art and Design
 2013 Dizengoff Prize for painting

See also
Visual arts in Israel

References

External links 

 
 
 
 

Israeli painters
Living people
1952 births